is a Japanese documentary directed by Hitomi Kamanaka and released in 2006. It is the second in Kamanaka's trilogy of films on the problems of nuclear power and radiation, preceded by Hibakusha at the End of the World (also known as Radiation: A Slow Death) and followed by Ashes to Honey.

Content

The documentary reports on the issues surrounding the construction of the Rokkasho Reprocessing Plant in Aomori Prefecture, especially focusing on the lives of the nearby residents who, while nervous about the dangers of radiation, continue living near the plant. It also covers the protests against the plant.

Reception
In a poll of critics at Kinema Junpo, Rokkasho Rhapsody was selected as the fourth best documentary of 2006.

See also
List of books about nuclear issues
List of films about nuclear issues
Ashes to Honey

References

Bibliography

External links
Official site (in English)
Japanese Film Database

2006 in the environment
Japanese documentary films
Environmental films
Anti-nuclear films
Documentary films about nuclear technology
2000s Japanese-language films
2000s Japanese films